Wavin B.V. is a Dutch manufacturer of plastic pipes, mainly for drainage and water supply purposes. The company was officially founded on 5 August 1955, its name deriving from water and vinyl chloride. The company provides plastic pipe systems and products for tap water, surface heating and cooling, soil and waste, rain water, distribution of drinking water and gas and telecom applications.

The company is headquartered in Schiphol, Netherlands and operates in 25 European countries. Via its central export organisation Wavin Overseas, the company has a network of agents and licensed partners in Asia, Australia, Africa, Latin America, the Middle East and North America. The Group also has a facility in Foshan, China.

Due to the common use of Wavin products, the name has become genericised in some parts of Ireland to refer to any manufacturer of orange-coloured drainpipes. The company operates in three locations in Ireland, with the main manufacturing and distribution plant in Balbriggan, North County Dublin, and additional offices in Lisburn and Cork 
.

Wavin's own Technology and Innovation Centre (Wavin T&I), employs more than 50 people to develop new products and systems with local Wavin companies. Products for the European market include the "smartFIX" push-fit fitting, the Tempower surface heating and cooling product, Tegra manholes and inspection chambers and the SiTech low noise in-house soil and waste system.
In 2012, Wavin was acquired by Orbia (previously Mexichem), a Mexican international company, expanding Mexichem's operations in 22 European countries.

References 

Companies based in Overijssel
Manufacturing companies of the Netherlands
Manufacturing companies established in 1955
Dutch brands
Dutch companies established in 1955
Zwolle